Bidama (also spelled Bdama and Badama) is a town in northern Syria, administratively part of the Idlib Governorate, located northwest of Idlib along the border with Turkey. Nearby localities include al-Najiyah to the southeast, Jisr al-Shughur to the east, Shughur al-Fuqani and al-Janudiyah to the northeast. According to the Syria Central Bureau of Statistics, Bidama had a population of 4,162 in the 2004 census. The town is also the administrative center and the second largest locality of the Bidama nahiyah which consisted of 14 localities with a combined population of 18,501 in 2004. Its inhabitants are predominantly Sunni Muslims.

Ancient ruins are situated just to the northeast of the town.

References

Bibliography

Populated places in Jisr al-Shughur District
Towns in Syria